The 1994 Guelph municipal election was held on November 14, 1994, in Guelph, Ontario, Canada, to elect the Mayor of Guelph, Guelph City Council and the Guelph members of the Upper Grand District School Board (Public) and Wellington Catholic District School Board. The election was one of many races across the province of Ontario.

Results
Names in bold denotes elected candidates. 
(X) denotes incumbent.

Mayor

Mayoral race

Ward 1

Ward 1 Councillor, 2 To Be Elected

Ward 2

Ward 2 Councillor, 2 To Be Elected

Ward 3

Ward 3 Councillor, 2 To Be Elected

Ward 4

Ward 4 Councillor, 2 To Be Elected

Ward 5

Ward 5 Councillor, 2 To Be Elected

Ward 6

Ward 6 Councillor, 2 To Be Elected

References

Guelph City Clerk, Cumulative totals with 164 polls reporting, November 14, 1994

1994 Ontario municipal elections
1994
November 1994 events in Canada